{{Infobox settlement
| name                     = Deccan
| native_name              = 
| native_name_lang         = 
| settlement_type          = Region
| image_flag               = 
| flag_alt                 = 
| image_seal               = 
| seal_alt                 = 
| image_shield             = 
| shield_alt               = 
| nickname                 = The Southern Country
| motto                    = 
| image_map                = File:Map of the Deccan 17th century.jpg
| map_alt                  = 
| map_caption              = Location of Deccan in South Asia
| pushpin_map              = 
| pushpin_label_position   = 
| pushpin_map_alt          = 
| pushpin_map_caption      = 
| coordinates              = 
| coor_pinpoint            = 
| coordinates_footnotes    = 
| subdivision_type         = Kingdoms
| subdivision_name         = 
| subdivision_type2        = Largest City
| subdivision_name2        = Hyderabad
| subdivision_type3        = 
| subdivision_name3        = 
| established_title        = 
| established_date         = 
| founder                  = 
| government_footnotes     = 
| leader_party             = 
| leader_title             = 
| leader_name              = 
| demographics_type1       = Demographics
| demographics1_footnotes  = 
| demographics1_title1     = Ethnic groups
| demographics1_info1      = Telugus, Marathis, Kannadigas, Deccanis, Hyderabadis, Lambadis, Gonds| demographics_type2       = 
| demographics2_footnotes  = 
| demographics1_title2     = Languages
| demographics1_info2      = Telugu, Marathi, Kannada, Deccani Urdu
| demographics_type3       = 
| demographics3_footnotes  = 
| demographics1_title3     = 
| demographics1_info3      = 
| blank_name_sec1          = 
| blank_info_sec1          = 
| blank_name_sec2          = 
| blank_info_sec2          = 
| unit_pref                = Metric

| area_footnotes           = 
| area_urban_footnotes     = 
| area_rural_footnotes     = 
| area_metro_footnotes     = 
| area_magnitude           = 
| area_note                = 
| area_water_percent       = 
| area_rank                = 
| area_blank1_title        = 
| area_blank2_title        = 
| area_total_km2           = 
| area_land_km2            = 
| area_water_km2           = 
| area_urban_km2           = 
| area_rural_km2           = 
| area_metro_km2           = 
| area_blank1_km2          = 
| area_blank2_km2          = 
| area_total_ha            = 
| area_land_ha             = 
| area_water_ha            = 
| area_urban_ha            = 
| area_rural_ha            = 
| area_metro_ha            = 
| area_blank1_ha           = 
| area_blank2_ha           = 
| length_km                = 
| width_km                 = 
| dimensions_footnotes     = 
| elevation_footnotes      = 
| elevation_m              = 
| population_as_of         = 
| population_total         = 
| population_density_km2   = auto
| population_note          = 
| population_demonym       = Deccani
| timezone1                = 
| utc_offset1              = 
| timezone2                = 
| utc_offset2              = 
| timezone1_DST            = 
| utc_offset1_DST          = 
| postal_code_type         = 
| postal_code              = 
| area_code_type           = 
| area_code                = 
| iso_code                 = 
| website                  = 
| footnotes                = 
| official_name            = Deccan
}}

Deccan, or the Deccan, is a historical and socio-political region of the Indian Subcontinent. Roughly corresponding to the geographic boundaries of the Deccan Plateau, it is often used to refer to lands and cultures north of Tamilakam, and south of the Vindhyas. Various polities including the Bahmanis, Deccan Sultanates, and Hyderabad Deccan have used this term to refer to their country.

Historians have defined the term Deccan differently. These definitions range from a narrow one by R. G. Bhandarkar (1920), who defines Deccan as the Marathi speaking area lying between the Godavari and Krishna rivers, to a broad one by K. M. Panikkar (1969), who defines it as the entire Indian peninsula to the south of the Vindhyas. Firishta (16th century) defined Deccan as the territory inhabited by the native speakers of Kannada, Marathi, and Telugu languages. Richard M. Eaton (2005) settles on this linguistic definition for a discussion of the region's geopolitical history.

Stewart N. Gordon (1998) notes that historically, the term "Deccan" and the northern border of Deccan has varied from Tapti River in the north to Godavari River in the south, depending on the southern boundary of the northern empires. Therefore, while discussing the history of the Marathas, Gordon uses Deccan as a "relational term", defining it as "the area beyond the southern border of a northern-based kingdom" of India.

Etymology

The word Deccan is an anglicized version of the word , found in many languages of the Deccan Monier-Williams Sanskrit-English Dictionary, p. 498 (scanned image at SriPedia Initiative): Sanskrit dakṣiṇa meaning 'southern'. It has etymological roots in the Sanskrit dakṣiṇa and the later Prakrit dakkhin'', which mean the "south".

Native Polities

 Satavahana Dynasty
 Bahmanis
 Qutb Shahis
 Hyderabad State (1724-1948)

References

Bibliography

 
 

Regions of India